Lucimycin (INN, also known as lucensomycin and etruscomycin) is a macrolide antibiotic synthesized by the bacterium Streptomyces lucensis. It belongs to the group of polyene antimycotics and was first isolated in the 1960s. It has seen only limited clinical use.

Lucimycin is also produced by the Streptomyces cyanogenus S136, where the full biosynthetic gene cluster for the production of this compound was described.

References

Further reading 
 

Macrolides